Independence Day Award, Bangladesh's highest civilian honours - Winners, 2020–2029:

2020 
Total 9 persons and 1 organisation were awarded.

Despite receiving the Independence Award in Literature in 2020, the controversial Raiz Uddin Medal was declared void due to various criticism.

2021 
Total 9 persons and 1 organisation were awarded.

2022 
Total 10 persons and 1 organisation were awarded.

2023 
Total 9 persons and 1 organisation were awarded.

See also 

 List of Independence Day Award recipients (1977–79)
 List of Independence Day Award recipients (1980–89)
 List of Independence Day Award recipients (1990–99)
 List of Independence Day Award recipients (2000–09)
 List of Independence Day Award recipients (2010–19)

References 

Civil awards and decorations of Bangladesh
Recipients of the Independence Day Award